Rootsi may refer to:

Rootsi is an Estonian name for Sweden
Rootsi, Hiiu County, village in Hiiu Parish, Hiiu County, Estonia
Rootsi, Rapla County, village in Kohila Parish, Rapla County, Estonia